The Holland Festival is the oldest and largest performing arts festival in the Netherlands. It takes place every June in Amsterdam. It comprises theatre, music, opera and modern dance. In recent years, multimedia, visual arts, film and architecture were added to the festival roster.

Performances take place in Amsterdam venues such as the city theatre, the opera, the Concertgebouw and Muziekgebouw concert halls and the Westergas factory site. Each edition is loosely themed, and the programme features both contemporary work and classical pieces presented with a modern edge.

History

The festival was founded in 1947 and features some of the world's top artists and performers, as well as lesser-known performers. Notable world premieres included Karlheinz Stockhausen's Helicopter String Quartet. The festival introduced Maria Callas in the Netherlands, and was also the first to successfully set up a large symphonic tribute to Frank Zappa with "200 motels-the suite" in 2000 (after failed attempts to have Zappa perform himself in the festival in 1981).

From 2005, the festival included off-series called EarFuel, EyeFuel and MindFuel. Outreach initiatives to new audiences include successful non-western concerts such as an Umm Kalsoum tribute by Egyptian star Amal Maher in 2010. The festival continues to serve as a beacon for other arts organisations, and is visited by a record number of international programmers and artists, seeking inspiration.

From 2005 to 2014 the Holland Festival was curated by artistic director Pierre Audi, followed by Ruth Mackenzie in 2014.

, the Holland Festival had a Director/Chief Executive who was both artistically and commercially responsible. This role was fulfilled by Annet Lekkerkerker. Her position as managing director was taken over by Emily Ansenk in September 2019.

References

External links

 
 
 Holland Festival at Google Cultural Institute

1947 establishments in the Netherlands
Classical music festivals in the Netherlands
Cultural festivals in the Netherlands
Culture in Amsterdam
Music festivals established in 1947
Music festivals in the Netherlands
Festivals established in 1947
Theatre festivals in the Netherlands
Summer events in the Netherlands